The year 1969 in television involved some significant events. Below is a list of television-related events in 1969.

Events
January 4 – NBC expands the Huntley-Brinkley Report to Saturdays, with Chet Huntley and David Brinkley alternating weeks anchoring the news solo. Later, mediocre ratings prompt NBC to replace the duo with other newsmen, with the broadcast rechristened NBC Saturday News.
January 13 – Dick York collapses on the set of Bewitched and is rushed to the hospital. He resigns from the show due to health reasons and is replaced by Dick Sargent.
February 5 – ABC runs the one and only airing of the notorious flop Turn-On.
February 9 – CBS presents the Royal Shakespeare Company's version of A Midsummer Night's Dream, starring Diana Rigg, David Warner, and Helen Mirren.
February 19 – At exactly 4:31 p.m. at the CBS Studio Center, with Jim Nabors saying the line "How interesting – and did she?", Gomer Pyle, U.S.M.C. shoots its final scene and completes its run.
March 29 – Lulu performs "Boom Bang-a-Bang" at the Eurovision Song Contest 1969 in Madrid, and ends up in a four-way tie for first place, with 18 votes.
April 4 – CBS bans the Smothers Brothers. Three days later, Walter Cronkite opens the evening newscast by confirming that the Smothers Brothers have been replaced by Hee Haw – effective immediately. But because it takes two months to assemble a typical Hee-Haw segment, CBS has to fill the time period with specials until Hee Haw premieres on June 15.
April 11 – Rome, as only he could see it, is presented in Fellini, a Director's Notebook, an NBC special.
April 13 – Dick Van Dyke and Mary Tyler Moore are reunited for a special, Dick Van Dyke and the Other Woman, on CBS.
June 3 – The science fiction television series Star Trek airs its final new episode after being canceled by NBC. Its subsequent sale into rerun syndication soon after leads to a rise in popularity that transforms Star Trek into one of the century's most successful entertainment franchises.
June 21 – On the BBC
Patrick Troughton makes his last regular appearance as the Second Doctor in the concluding moments of Episode 10 of the Doctor Who serial The War Games. It also marks the final time that the series is broadcast in black and white.
Showing of the documentary The Royal Family, which attracts more than 30.6 million viewers, an all-time British record for a non-current event programme.
July 3 – An elephant called Lulu runs amok on Blue Peter. The clip is subsequently repeated many times, becoming the archetypal British TV "blooper".
July 20 – A live transmission from the Moon is viewed by 720 million people around the world, with the landing of Apollo 11; at 10:56 p.m. EDT Neil Armstrong (followed soon afterwards by Buzz Aldrin) steps onto the surface; viewers see a scan from broadcasts received at Honeysuckle Creek Tracking Station followed by Parkes Observatory in Australia.
July 25 – Senator Edward Kennedy goes on TV to talk about the Chappaquiddick incident
August 14 – Roman Polanski goes on TV to give his take on the Tate-LaBianca murders.
August 18 – CBS pits Merv Griffin against Johnny Carson in the late-night talk-show arena – Carson wins.
September 1 – TV Globo launches its first news and current-affairs program, Jornal Nacional, running Monday through Saturday.
September 8 – From now on, all daytime programs on ABC and CBS are in color.
September 26 – The Brady Bunch premieres on ABC.
October 5 – The first episode of Monty Python's Flying Circus is broadcast by the BBC. 
October 15 – Radio Philippines Network ventures into television broadcasting with the successful launch of the network's flagship station KBS TV Channel 9. Properties and funding for the new TV network partly come from ABS-CBN in the form of its old headquarters along Roxas Boulevard and equipment from Toshiba enabling them to broadcast in color. As a result, on its launch it is named Accucolor 9 ("Accucolor" is the name of the color technology used) as the first Philippine television network to launch in full color. 
October 18 – The Jackson 5 make their national television debut on The Hollywood Palace.
October 24 – After much experimentation, Televisión Nacional de Chile begins broadcasting over a network of 16 TV stations scattered all over Chile.
November 3 – The first Network News bulletin in New Zealand goes to air, after the NZBC TV network is commissioned liking the country's four regional television stations (AKTV2, WNTV1, CHTV3 and DNTV2).
November 10 – Sesame Street makes its debut on NET (later PBS) (1969–present).
November 12 – The animated special Hey, Hey, Hey, It's Fat Albert, based on Bill Cosby's stand-up comedy, airs on NBC (it would be the inspiration for the later Saturday-morning cartoon, Fat Albert and the Cosby Kids).
November 13 – Vice-president Spiro Agnew, in a televised speech from Des Moines, Iowa, stirs up a national controversy by attacking the network news commentaries.
November 15 – Colour introduced to BBC1 and ITV in the UK.
November 16 – The Rolling Stones make their final appearance on The Ed Sullivan Show.
December 2 – In tonight's episode of I Dream of Jeannie, Jeannie (Barbara Eden) finally becomes Mrs. Anthony Nelson
December 7 - Frosty the Snowman premieres on CBS, before becoming an iconic Christmas television special and based on the song of the same name
December 12 – The Archies' Sugar Sugar Jingle Jangle Christmas Show airs on CBS. It is not a success.
December 17 – Tiny Tim gets married on Johnny Carson's The Tonight Show.

Programs/programmes
60 Minutes (1968–present)
Adam-12 (1968-1975)
American Bandstand (1952–89)
Another World (1964–99)
As the World Turns (1956–2010)
Bewitched (1964–1972)
Blue Peter (UK) (1958–present)
Bonanza (1959–73)
Bozo the Clown (1949–present)
Candid Camera (1948–present)
Captain Kangaroo (1955–84)
Come Dancing (UK) (1949–95)
Coronation Street (UK) (1960–present)
Crossroads (UK) (1964–88, 2001–03)
Dad's Army (UK) (1968–77)
Daniel Boone (1964–70)
Dark Shadows (1966–71)
Dragnet (franchise) (1951-1959, 1967–1970)
Days of Our Lives (1965–present)
Dixon of Dock Green (UK) (1955–76)
Doctor Who (UK) (1963–89, 1996, 2005–present)
Face the Nation (1954–present)
Family Affair (1966–71)
Four Corners (Australia) (1961–present)
General Hospital (1963–present)
Get Smart (1965–70)
Gomer Pyle, U.S.M.C. (1964–69)
Grandstand (UK) (1958–2007)
Green Acres (1965–71)
Gunsmoke (1955–75)
Hallmark Hall of Fame (1951–present)
Hawaii Five-O (1968–80)
Here Come the Brides (1968–70)
Here's Lucy (1968–74)
Hockey Night in Canada (1952–present)
Hogan's Heroes (1965–71)
I Dream of Jeannie (1965–70)
Ironside (1967–75)
It's Academic (1961–present)
Jeopardy! (1964–75, 1984–present)
Julia (1968–71)
Kimba the White Lion (1966–67)
Laugh-In (1968–73)
Love is a Many Splendored Thing (1967–73)
Love of Life (1951–80)
Magpie (UK) (1968–80)
Mannix (1967–75)
Mayberry R.F.D. (a continuation of The Andy Griffith Show, 1960-68), (1968–71)
Meet the Press (1947–present)
 The Mind of Mr. J.G. Reeder (UK) (1969-1971)
Mission: Impossible (1966–73)
Mutual of Omaha's Wild Kingdom (1963–88, 2002–present)
My Three Sons (1960–72)
One Life to Live (1968–2012)
Opportunity Knocks (UK) (1956–78)
Panorama (UK) (1953–present)
Petticoat Junction (1963–70)
Play School (1966–present)
Scooby-Doo, Where Are You! (1969–70)
Search for Tomorrow (1951–86)
Sesame Street (1969–present)
Spider-Man (1967–70)
That Girl (1966–71)
The Beverly Hillbillies (1962–71)
The Carol Burnett Show (1967–78)
The Dean Martin Show (1965–74)
The Doctors (1963–82)
The Doris Day Show (1968–73)
The Ed Sullivan Show (1948–71)
The Edge of Night (1956–84)
The Flying Nun (1967–70)
The Good Old Days (UK) (1953–83)
The Guiding Light (1952–2009)
The Honeymooners (1952–70)
The Johnny Cash Show (1969–71)
The Late Late Show (Ireland) (1962–present)
The Lawrence Welk Show (1955–82)
The Mike Douglas Show (1961–81)
The Mod Squad (1968–73)
The Money Programme (UK) (1966–present)
The Mothers-in-Law (1967–69)
The Newlywed Game (1966–74)
The Secret Storm (1954–74)
The Sky at Night (UK) (1957–present)
The Today Show (1952–present)
The Tonight Show (1954–present)
The Wednesday Play (UK) (1964–70)
This Is Your Life (UK) (1955–2003)
Tom and Jerry (1965–72, 1975–77, 1980–82)
Top of the Pops (UK) (1964–2006)
Truth or Consequences (1950–88)
Walt Disney's Wonderful World of Color (1961 – July 1971 under this title; has aired regularly since 1954)
What the Papers Say (UK) (1956–present)
World of Sport (UK) (1965–85)
Z-Cars (UK) (1962–78)

Debuts
January 3 – Der Kommissar (1969–76) on ZDF in Germany 
February 7 – This Is Tom Jones (1969–71) on ABC
March 9 - Department S (1969–70) on ITV
April 10 - Peanuts (1969–81) on CBS
April 23 – The Mind of Mr. J.G. Reeder (1969-1971) on ITV
June 7 – The Johnny Cash Show (1969–71) on ABC
June 15 – Hee Haw (1969–92) on CBS
June 18 – The Main Chance (1969–75) on ITV
September 6 – H.R. Pufnstuf (1969–71) on NBC
September 8 – Where the Heart Is (1969–73) on CBS daytime
September 11 – Time for Living (1969) on CBC Television
September 13 – 
Scooby-Doo, Where Are You! (1969–72), Dastardly and Muttley in Their Flying Machines (1969-70), and The Perils of Penelope Pitstop (1969–70) on CBS Saturday Morning
The Archie Comedy Hour (1969–70) on CBS Saturday Morning
September 17 –
Room 222 (high school drama series) on ABC (1969–74)
The Courtship of Eddie's Father on ABC (1969–72)
September 20 – Warner Brothers releases the final Looney Tunes animated short of the classic (1929–69) era
September 21 – Randall and Hopkirk (Deceased) ITV in the UK
September 23 – Marcus Welby, M.D. (1969–76) on ABC
September 24 – Medical Center (1969–76) on CBS
September 26 – The Brady Bunch (1969–74) on ABC
September 29
Bright Promise (1969–72), the latter of the soap operas created by Frank and Doris Hursley, on NBC daytime
Love, American Style (1969–74) on ABC
October 5
Monty Python's Flying Circus (1969–74) on BBC1
Sazae-san (1969–present) as a kids' comedy on Fuji Television in Japan
October 7 – Mary, Mungo and Midge (1969) on BBC1
November 8 – NBC airs the pilot episode of Rod Serling's science fiction anthology series Night Gallery, which would be picked up as a regular series for the 1970–71 television season
November 10 – Sesame Street on National Educational Television (the predecessor to the Public Broadcasting Service) (1969–present)
November 16 – The first episode of Clangers (1969–72) (a British stop motion animated television program for children) is broadcast by the BBC
November 19 – The Benny Hill Show (1969–89) on Thames Television (UK)
November 23 – Paul Temple (1969–71) on the BBC

Ending this year

Changes of network affiliation

Births

Deaths

Television debuts
Albert Brooks – Marcus Welby, M.D.
Farrah Fawcett – Mayberry R.F.D.
Nick Nolte – Death Valley Days

See also
 1969–70 United States network television schedule

References